Parliamentary elections were held in Laos on 21 February 2021 to elect the members of the ninth National Assembly. Provincial elections took place simultaneously.

Background
The Lao People's Revolutionary Party is the sole party that can field candidates. During the 2016 Laotian parliamentary election the party obtained 144 of 149 total seats, with the rest won by independent candidates.

In total, Laos has 4,280,000 eligible voters, according to the National Election Committee.

Electoral system
The 149 members of the National Assembly are elected for 5 year terms from 18 multi-member constituencies with between 5 and 19 seats using the multiple non-transferable vote system. Candidates need to gain the support of a local authority or a mass organisation to run for office. In each constituency, voters vote for a list with as many candidates as there are seats to be filled, and the list with the most votes wins all of its seats. The seat distribution changes based on the population. Each province is given a minimum of five seats, and one additional seat is given for every 50,000 inhabitants starting at 250,000 inhabitants, up to a maximum of 19 seats. 

In excess of 7,200 polling stations were used, with overseas voting possible in forty other countries.

Campaign
A total of 224 candidate contested the National Assembly elections, with 788 candidate competing for the 492 Provincial People's Councils seats. Younger, as well as middle-aged candidates, made up a larger percentage of the candidates than usual, as a result of a push from the Laotian government for younger people to get involved in politics.

Results
On 1 March the Vientiane Times reported that vote counts had not been finalized yet, but would likely be within the week. The new National Assembly met for the first time on 22 March.

References

Elections in Laos
Laos
Parliamentary
Election and referendum articles with incomplete results